Hrvatski nogometni klub Hajduk Split is a professional football club based in Split, Croatia, which plays in the Prva HNL. This chronological list comprises all those who have held the position of manager of the first team of Hajduk Split from 1911, when the first professional manager was appointed, to the present day.

The first manager of Hajduk Split was Bohemian Oldřich Just, who joined the club in 1911 as a player-manager. He was in charge from 1911 to 1912. The current manager is Ivan Leko, who took over the club in December 2022.

List of Hajduk managers

1911–1992

1992–
Only first-team competitive matches are counted. Wins, losses and draws are results at the final whistle; the results of penalty shoot-outs are not counted.
Statistics are complete up to and including the match played on 31 October 2021

Key
M = matches played; W = matches won; D = matches drawn; L = matches lost; GF = goals for; GA = goals against; Win % = percentage of total matches won
  Managers with this background and symbol in the "Name" column are italicised to denote caretaker appointments.
  Managers with this background and symbol in the "Name" column are italicised to denote caretaker appointments promoted to full-time manager.

1 Kalinić tenure as Hajduk manager was terminated after suffering a heart attack following European League home loss against Žilina, his debut game in charge of the club.

Source: hrnogomet.com

Source: hrnogomet.com

Honours
The following table lists managers according to trophies won. The most successful manager to date was Tomislav Ivić who had four spells with the club (1973–76, 1978–80, 1987, 1997) and led Hajduk to a total of 7 trophies, three Yugoslav First League championships (1974, 1975, and 1979) and four Yugoslav Cup titles (1972, 1973, 1974, and 1976).

Since the inception of Croatian association football league competition, the Prva HNL in 1992, most successful was Ivan Katalinić, who also claimed 7 trophies. During his three spells at Hajduk (1993–95, 1998–99, 2004), Katalinić won two Croatian First League championships (1994, 1995), two Croatian Cup titles (1993, 1995) and three Croatian Supercup titles (1993, 1994 and 2004).

Petar Nadoveza is the only manager to have won honours available to Hajduk in both the Yugoslav and Croatian football league systems, winning the Yugoslav Cup in 1984 and Croatian Cup in 2000. In 2004, he also won the Croatian First League, after taking over from Zoran Vulić three rounds before the end of the champhionship.

Key

CL = Croatian First League
CC = Croatian Cup
CS = Croatian Supercup
YL = Yugoslav First League (defunct since 1991)
YC = Yugoslav Cup (defunct since 1991)

Winning managers

2 Croatian First League was temporarily played during 1940's, under flags of Banate of Croatia, Independent State of Croatia and Socialist Republic of Croatia. Hajduk won a title in Banate of Croatia (1940), two in SR Croatia (1945, 1946) while refusing to participate in championships during Independent State of Croatia (1941–45).

References

External links
List of Hajduk managers at the Hajduk Split official website 

 
Hajduk Split